High Conquest is a 1947 American drama film directed by Irving Allen and starring Anna Lee, Gilbert Roland, and Warren Douglas. It was adapted from the 1941 book of the same title by James Ramsey Ullman. It was distributed by Monogram Pictures.

Synopsis
In 1932 at the Alpine Club in London Colonel Hugh Banning recounts a fatal expedition to the Matterhorn in Switzerland thirty years before in which a local guide fell and brought down an American climber, both tumbling to their deaths. Jeffrey Stevens, a chemist and the son of the American who fell is heading to visit his father's grave, but rejects any suggestion that he should climb the mountain. He meets an attractive pianist Marie who is returning home and the two hit it off. This provokes jealous from Hugo, the son of the guide who had died with Jeffrey's father decades before. Eventually Jeffrey is goaded into overcoming his fear of the mountain and taking part in a climb with Hugo, who tries to murder him at the summit.

Cast

Anna Lee as Marie Correl
Gilbert Roland as Hugo Lanier
Warren Douglas as Geoffrey Stevens
Beulah Bondi as Clara Kingsley
C. Aubrey Smith as Col. Hugh Bunning
John Qualen as Peter Oberwalder Sr.
Helene Thimig as Frau Oberwalder
Alan Napier as Tommy Donlin
Eric Feldary as Jules Koerber
Mickey Kuhn as Peter Oberwalder Jr.
 Louis Mercier as 	Franz
 John Good as Joel Hazlitt
 John Vosper as 	Mr. Stefani
 Wilton Graff as 	Mr. Douglaston
 Ferike Boros as 	Grandmother on Train
 Maurice Cass as Tony - the Waiter
 Fritz Leiber as Priest
 Eddie Parks as 	Steward
 Mary Field as 	Miss Woodley
 John Bleifer as 	Traveler
 Douglas Walton as Hugo Bunning as a Young man
 Regina Wallace as 	Miss Spencer

Production
Allen shot on location in Switzerland. He shot so much footage that he turned it into a documentary, Climbing the Matterhorn, which won an Oscar. He used color film from Ansco on the understanding that if the results were unsatisfactory the company could have the film back. However, the results were so good Ansco did a deal with Allen for him to use three films in color.

References

External links

1947 films
1947 romantic drama films
American black-and-white films
American romantic drama films
Films based on American novels
Films directed by Irving Allen
Films scored by Lyn Murray
Films set in Switzerland
Films set in London
Films set in the Alps
Films set in the 1930s
Films shot in Switzerland
Monogram Pictures films
Mountaineering films
1940s English-language films
1940s American films